Alfred George Cyril Michael Nightingale  (6 October 1922 – 8 May 1999) was an English stage, film and television actor. He appeared in 13 (9 credited and 4 uncredited) of the Carry On film series - the tenth highest number of appearances.

Selected filmography

 The Man Who Watched Trains Go By (1952) - Popinga's Clerk
 Noose for a Lady (1953) - The Barrister
 Is Your Honeymoon Really Necessary? (1953) - Policeman
 Man in the Shadow (1957) - B.E.A. Official (uncredited)
 Ice Cold in Alex (1958) - C.M.P. Captain - Check Point
 The Stranglers of Bombay (1959) - Sidney Flood (uncredited)
 The Young Jacobites (1960) - Colonel
 Watch Your Stern (1960) - Sailor
 The Silent Weapon (1961) - Inspector Hammond 
 Carry On Regardless (1961) - Wine Bystander (uncredited)
 Raising the Wind (1961) - Invigilator
 The Iron Maiden (1962) - Senior Rally Steward
 Carry On Cabby (1963) - Businessman
 Carry On Jack (1963) - Town Crier
 Carry On Cleo (1964) - Ancient Briton
 Curse of the Voodoo (1965) - Hunter #2
 Sky West and Crooked (1965) - Doctor
 Carry On Cowboy (1965) - Bank Manager
 Don't Lose Your Head (1966) - 'What locket?' Man (uncredited)
 Follow That Camel (1967) - Nightingale the Butler (uncredited)
 Decline and Fall... of a Birdwatcher (1968) - Colonel Clutterbuck
 Journey to Midnight (1968) - Butler (episode 'Poor Butterfly')
 Night After Night After Night (1969) - Martingale, solicitor
 Carry On Camping (1969) - Man in cinema
 Clegg (1970) - Col. Sullivan
 Tora! Tora! Tora! (1970) - (uncredited)
 The Raging Moon (1971) - Mr. Thomas
 Carry On Matron (1972) - Pearson
 Mutiny on the Buses (1972) - Pilot
 Bless This House (1972) - Vicar
 Carry On Girls (1973) - City Gent  on Tube (uncredited)
 Carry On Dick (1974) - Squire Trelawney
 The Internecine Project (1974) - Businessman #1
 The Return of the Pink Panther (1975) - Museum Tourist
 Carry On England (1976) - Officer
 Carry On Emmannuelle (1978) - Police Commissioner 
 Dominique (1978) - Vicar at Funeral

References

External links
 
 

1922 births
1999 deaths
English male stage actors
English male film actors
English male television actors
People from Brighton
20th-century English male actors